Jordi "Chiqui" Sans Juan (born August 3, 1965 in Barcelona, Catalonia) is a former water polo player from Spain, who was a member of the national team that won the gold medal at the 1996 Summer Olympics in Atlanta, United States. Four years earlier, when his home town of Barcelona hosted the Games, he was on the side that captured the silver medal.

Sans played in five consecutive Summer Olympics for his native country from 1984  to 2000. He is, jointly with Greek Georgios Mavrotas, the fifth athlete to compete in water polo at five Olympics, after Briton Paul Radmilovic, Hungarian Dezső Gyarmati, Italian Gianni De Magistris, and fellow Spaniard Manuel Estiarte. He is also, jointly with fencer Antonio García and shooter Jorge González, the seventh Spaniard to compete at five Olympics, after shooter Eladio Vallduvi, equestrian Luis Álvarez de Cervera, shooter Juan Seguí, water polo player Manuel Estiarte, hurdler Carlos Sala, and sailor José Luis Doreste.

See also
 Spain men's Olympic water polo team records and statistics
 List of athletes with the most appearances at Olympic Games
 List of players who have appeared in multiple men's Olympic water polo tournaments
 List of Olympic champions in men's water polo
 List of Olympic medalists in water polo (men)
 List of men's Olympic water polo tournament top goalscorers
 List of world champions in men's water polo
 List of World Aquatics Championships medalists in water polo

References

External links
 

1965 births
Living people
Water polo players from Barcelona
Spanish male water polo players
Water polo centre forwards
Water polo players at the 1984 Summer Olympics
Water polo players at the 1988 Summer Olympics
Water polo players at the 1992 Summer Olympics
Water polo players at the 1996 Summer Olympics
Water polo players at the 2000 Summer Olympics
Medalists at the 1992 Summer Olympics
Medalists at the 1996 Summer Olympics
Olympic gold medalists for Spain in water polo
Olympic silver medalists for Spain in water polo
World Aquatics Championships medalists in water polo
Sportsmen from Catalonia